The People's Independent Party (PIP) is a political party based in Castle Point, England. Formed in 2020 by Independent councillor Steven Cole and registered in 2022, PIP's aim is to give a voice to local people and take control of the council from the ruling Conservatives. At formation, the party was joined by 4 councillors (including Cole), all originally elected as Independents. The party's other focuses are on stopping a Conservative-led plan to build 5,000 homes in the borough, expand activities for children, and push for streetlights to be turned back on between 1am and 5am.

Following the results of the 2022 election, the PIP gained 6 seats to take their tally to 10 councillors, and ending over 20 years of Conservative control of Castle Point Borough Council. A new joint administration was formed between the PIP and the Canvey Island Independent Party, with Steven Cole becoming Deputy Leader of the council.

References

Political parties in England
Political parties
Political parties in the United Kingdom